Hilbeck is a village in the city of Werl, district of Soest in the German State of North Rhine-Westphalia. Hilbeck has around 1,300 inhabitants. The castle Haus Hilbeck is in Hilbeck.

Villages in North Rhine-Westphalia
Soest (district)